Duncan Township is located in Mercer County, Illinois. As of the 2010 census, its population was 272 and it contained 124 housing units.

Duncan Township bears the name of Buford Duncan, a pioneer settler.

Geography

Demographics

References

External links
City-data.com
Illinois State Archives

Townships in Mercer County, Illinois
Townships in Illinois